

Peerage of England, Scotland and Great Britain

Dukes

|colspan=5 style="background: #fcc" align="center"|Peerage of England
|-
|rowspan=2|Duke of Cornwall (1337)||Prince George, Prince of Wales||1714||1727||Succeeded to the Throne
|-
|Frederick, Prince of Wales||1727||1751||Created Duke of Edinburgh in 1726
|-
|Duke of Norfolk (1483)||Thomas Howard, 8th Duke of Norfolk||1701||1732||
|-
|Duke of Somerset (1547)||Charles Seymour, 6th Duke of Somerset||1678||1748||
|-
|Duke of Cleveland (1670)||Charles FitzRoy, 2nd Duke of Cleveland||1709||1730||
|-
|Duke of Portsmouth (1673)||Louise de Kérouaille, Duchess of Portsmouth||1673||1734||
|-
|rowspan=2|Duke of Richmond (1675)||Charles Lennox, 1st Duke of Richmond||1675||1723||Died
|-
|Charles Lennox, 2nd Duke of Richmond||1723||1750||
|-
|Duke of Grafton (1675)||Charles FitzRoy, 2nd Duke of Grafton||1690||1757||
|-
|Duke of Beaufort (1682)||Henry Scudamore, 3rd Duke of Beaufort||1714||1745||
|-
|rowspan=2|Duke of St Albans (1684)||Charles Beauclerk, 1st Duke of St Albans||1684||1726||Died
|-
|Charles Beauclerk, 2nd Duke of St Albans||1726||1751||
|-
|rowspan=2|Duke of Bolton (1689)||Charles Paulet, 2nd Duke of Bolton||1699||1722||Died
|-
|Charles Powlett, 3rd Duke of Bolton||1722||1754||
|-
|rowspan=2|Duke of Leeds (1694)||Peregrine Osborne, 2nd Duke of Leeds||1712||1729||Died
|-
|Peregrine Osborne, 3rd Duke of Leeds||1729||1731||
|-
|Duke of Bedford (1694)||Wriothesley Russell, 3rd Duke of Bedford||1711||1732||
|-
|rowspan=2|Duke of Devonshire (1694)||William Cavendish, 2nd Duke of Devonshire||1707||1729||Died
|-
|William Cavendish, 3rd Duke of Devonshire||1729||1755||
|-
|rowspan=2|Duke of Marlborough (1702)||John Churchill, 1st Duke of Marlborough||1702||1722||Died
|-
|Henrietta Godolphin, 2nd Duchess of Marlborough||1722||1733||
|-
|rowspan=2|Duke of Buckingham and Normanby (1703)||John Sheffield, 1st Duke of Buckingham and Normanby||1703||1721||Died
|-
|Edmund Sheffield, 2nd Duke of Buckingham and Normanby||1721||1735||
|-
|rowspan=2|Duke of Rutland (1703)||John Manners, 2nd Duke of Rutland||1711||1721||Died
|-
|John Manners, 3rd Duke of Rutland||1721||1779||
|-
|Duke of Montagu (1705)||John Montagu, 2nd Duke of Montagu||1709||1749||
|-
|colspan=5 style="background: #fcc" align="center"|Peerage of Scotland
|-
|Duke of Hamilton (1643)||James Hamilton, 5th Duke of Hamilton||1712||1743||
|-
|Duke of Buccleuch (1663)||Anne Scott, 1st Duchess of Buccleuch||1663||1732||
|-
|Duke of Queensberry (1684)||Charles Douglas, 3rd Duke of Queensberry||1711||1778||
|-
|rowspan=2|Duke of Gordon (1684)||Alexander Gordon, 2nd Duke of Gordon||1716||1728||Died
|-
|Cosmo Gordon, 3rd Duke of Gordon||1728||1752||
|-
|Duke of Argyll (1701)||John Campbell, 2nd Duke of Argyll||1703||1743||
|-
|rowspan=2|Duke of Atholl (1703)||John Murray, 1st Duke of Atholl||1703||1724||Died
|-
|James Murray, 2nd Duke of Atholl||1724||1764||
|-
|Duke of Douglas (1703)||Archibald Douglas, 1st Duke of Douglas||1703||1761||
|-
|Duke of Montrose (1707)||James Graham, 1st Duke of Montrose||1707||1742||
|-
|Duke of Roxburghe (1707)||John Ker, 1st Duke of Roxburghe||1707||1741||
|-
|colspan=5 style="background: #fcc" align="center"|Peerage of Great Britain
|-
|Duke of Kent (1710)||Henry Grey, 1st Duke of Kent||1710||1740||
|-
|rowspan=2|Duke of Ancaster and Kesteven (1715)||Robert Bertie, 1st Duke of Ancaster and Kesteven||1715||1723||Died
|-
|Peregrine Bertie, 2nd Duke of Ancaster and Kesteven||1723||1742||
|-
|rowspan=2|Duke of Kingston-upon-Hull (1715)||Evelyn Pierrepont, 1st Duke of Kingston-upon-Hull||1715||1726||Died
|-
|Evelyn Pierrepont, 2nd Duke of Kingston-upon-Hull||1726||1773||
|-
|Duke of Newcastle upon Tyne (1715)||Thomas Pelham-Holles, 1st Duke of Newcastle||1715||1768||
|-
|Duke of York and Albany (1716)||Ernest Augustus, Duke of York and Albany||1716||1728||Died, title extinct
|-
|rowspan=2|Duke of Portland (1716)||Henry Bentinck, 1st Duke of Portland||1716||1726||Died
|-
|William Bentinck, 2nd Duke of Portland||1726||1762||
|-
|Duke of Wharton (1716)||Philip Wharton, 1st Duke of Wharton||1718||1729||Titles were forfeited
|-
|Duchess of Kendal (1719)||Melusine von der Schulenburg, Duchess of Kendal||1719||1743||
|-
|rowspan=2|Duke of Manchester (1719)||Charles Montagu, 1st Duke of Manchester||1719||1722||Died
|-
|William Montagu, 2nd Duke of Manchester||1722||1739||
|-
|Duke of Chandos (1719)||James Brydges, 1st Duke of Chandos||1719||1744||
|-
|Duke of Dorset (1720)||Lionel Sackville, 1st Duke of Dorset||1720||1765||New creation
|-
|Duke of Bridgewater (1720)||Scroop Egerton, 1st Duke of Bridgewater||1720||1745||New creation
|-
|Duke of Cumberland (1726)||Prince William, Duke of Cumberland||1726||1765||New creation
|-
|}

Marquesses

|colspan=5 style="background: #fcc" align="center"|Peerage of England
|-
|Marquess of Powis (1687)||William Herbert, 2nd Marquess of Powis||1696||1745||
|-
|colspan=5 style="background: #fcc" align="center"|Peerage of Scotland
|-
|Marquess of Tweeddale (1694)||John Hay, 4th Marquess of Tweeddale||1715||1762||
|-
|rowspan=2|Marquess of Lothian (1701)||William Kerr, 2nd Marquess of Lothian||1703||1722||Died
|-
|William Kerr, 3rd Marquess of Lothian||1722||1767||
|-
|rowspan=2|Marquess of Annandale (1701)||William Johnstone, 1st Marquess of Annandale||1701||1721||Died
|-
|James Johnstone, 2nd Marquess of Annandale||1721||1730||
|-
|colspan=5 style="background: #fcc" align="center"|Peerage of Great Britain
|-
|colspan=5 align="center"|-
|-
|}

Earls

|colspan=5 style="background: #fcc" align="center"|Peerage of England
|-
|Earl of Shrewsbury (1442)||Gilbert Talbot, 13th Earl of Shrewsbury||1718||1743||
|-
|Earl of Derby (1485)||James Stanley, 10th Earl of Derby||1702||1736||
|-
|Earl of Huntingdon (1529)||Theophilus Hastings, 9th Earl of Huntingdon||1705||1746||
|-
|Earl of Pembroke (1551)||Thomas Herbert, 8th Earl of Pembroke||1683||1733||
|-
|Earl of Devon (1553)||William Courtenay, de jure 6th Earl of Devon||1702||1735||
|-
|rowspan=2|Earl of Lincoln (1572)||Henry Clinton, 7th Earl of Lincoln||1693||1728||Died
|-
|George Clinton, 8th Earl of Lincoln||1728||1730||
|-
|rowspan=2|Earl of Suffolk (1603)||Charles Howard, 7th Earl of Suffolk||1718||1722||Died
|-
|Edward Howard, 8th Earl of Suffolk||1722||1731||
|-
|Earl of Dorset (1604)||Lionel Sackville, 7th Earl of Dorset||1706||1765||Created Duke of Dorset, see above
|-
|rowspan=3|Earl of Exeter (1605)||John Cecil, 6th Earl of Exeter||1700||1721||Died
|-
|John Cecil, 7th Earl of Exeter||1721||1722||Died
|-
|Brownlow Cecil, 8th Earl of Exeter||1722||1754||
|-
|rowspan=2|Earl of Salisbury (1605)||James Cecil, 5th Earl of Salisbury||1694||1728||Died
|-
|James Cecil, 6th Earl of Salisbury||1728||1780||
|-
|Earl of Bridgewater (1617)||Scroop Egerton, 4th Earl of Bridgewater||1701||1744||Created Duke of Bridgewater, see above
|-
|rowspan=2|Earl of Northampton (1618)||George Compton, 4th Earl of Northampton||1681||1727||Died
|-
|James Compton, 5th Earl of Northampton||1727||1754||
|-
|Earl of Leicester (1618)||John Sidney, 6th Earl of Leicester||1705||1737||
|-
|rowspan=2|Earl of Warwick (1618)||Edward Rich, 7th Earl of Warwick||1702||1721||Died
|-
|Edward Rich, 8th Earl of Warwick||1721||1759||
|-
|Earl of Denbigh (1622)||William Feilding, 5th Earl of Denbigh||1717||1755||
|-
|Earl of Westmorland (1624)||Thomas Fane, 6th Earl of Westmorland||1699||1736||
|-
|Earl of Berkshire (1626)||Henry Howard, 4th Earl of Berkshire||1706||1757||
|-
|Earl Rivers (1626)||John Savage, 5th Earl Rivers||1712||1737||
|-
|Earl of Peterborough (1628)||Charles Mordaunt, 3rd Earl of Peterborough||1697||1735||
|-
|rowspan="2"|Earl of Stamford (1628)||Thomas Grey, 2nd Earl of Stamford||1673||1720||Died
|-
|Harry Grey, 3rd Earl of Stamford||1720||1739||
|-
|rowspan="3"|Earl of Winchilsea (1628)||Heneage Finch, 5th Earl of Winchilsea||1712||1726||Died
|-
|John Finch, 6th Earl of Winchilsea||1726||1729||Died
|-
|Daniel Finch, 7th Earl of Winchilsea||1729||1730||
|-
|rowspan="2"|Earl of Chesterfield (1628)||Philip Stanhope, 3rd Earl of Chesterfield||1714||1726||Died
|-
|Philip Stanhope, 4th Earl of Chesterfield||1726||1773||
|-
|rowspan="2"|Earl of Thanet (1628)||Thomas Tufton, 6th Earl of Thanet||1684||1729||Died
|-
|Sackville Tufton, 7th Earl of Thanet||1729||1753||
|-
|rowspan="3"|Earl of Sunderland (1643)||Charles Spencer, 3rd Earl of Sunderland||1702||1722||Died
|-
|Robert Spencer, 4th Earl of Sunderland||1722||1729||Died
|-
|Charles Spencer, 5th Earl of Sunderland||1729||1758||
|-
|Earl of Scarsdale (1645)||Nicholas Leke, 4th Earl of Scarsdale||1707||1736||
|-
|rowspan="2"|Earl of Sandwich (1660)||Edward Montagu, 3rd Earl of Sandwich||1688||1729||Died
|-
|John Montagu, 4th Earl of Sandwich||1729||1792||
|-
|Earl of Anglesey (1661)||Arthur Annesley, 5th Earl of Anglesey||1710||1737||
|-
|Earl of Cardigan (1661)||George Brudenell, 3rd Earl of Cardigan||1703||1732||
|-
|rowspan="2"|Earl of Clarendon (1661)||Edward Hyde, 3rd Earl of Clarendon||1709||1723||Died
|-
|Henry Hyde, 4th Earl of Clarendon||1723||1753||
|-
|Earl of Essex (1661)||William Capell, 3rd Earl of Essex||1710||1743||
|-
|Earl of Carlisle (1661)||Charles Howard, 3rd Earl of Carlisle||1692||1738||
|-
|Earl of Ailesbury (1664)||Thomas Bruce, 2nd Earl of Ailesbury||1685||1741||
|-
|Earl of Burlington (1664)||Richard Boyle, 3rd Earl of Burlington||1704||1753||Earl of Cork in the Peerage of Ireland
|-
|Earl of Arlington (1672)||Isabella Fitzroy, 2nd Countess of Arlington||1685||1723||Died; Earldom succeeded by the Duke of Grafton
|-
|Earl of Shaftesbury (1672)||Anthony Ashley Cooper, 4th Earl of Shaftesbury||1713||1771||
|-
|Earl of Lichfield (1674)||George Lee, 2nd Earl of Lichfield||1716||1742||
|-
|rowspan="2"|Earl of Radnor (1679)||Charles Robartes, 2nd Earl of Radnor||1685||1723||Died
|-
|Henry Robartes, 3rd Earl of Radnor||1723||1741||
|-
|Earl of Yarmouth (1679)||William Paston, 2nd Earl of Yarmouth||1683||1732||
|-
|Earl of Berkeley (1679)||James Berkeley, 3rd Earl of Berkeley||1710||1736||
|-
|Earl of Nottingham (1681)||Daniel Finch, 2nd Earl of Nottingham||1682||1730||Succeeded to the more senior Earldom of Winchilsea, see above
|-
|Earl of Rochester (1682)||Henry Hyde, 2nd Earl of Rochester||1711||1753||Succeeded to the more senior Earldom of Clarendon, see above
|-
|Earl of Abingdon (1682)||Montagu Venables-Bertie, 2nd Earl of Abingdon||1699||1743||
|-
|Earl of Gainsborough (1682)||Baptist Noel, 4th Earl of Gainsborough||1714||1751||
|-
|rowspan="2"|Earl of Plymouth (1682)||Other Windsor, 2nd Earl of Plymouth||1687||1727||Died
|-
|Other Windsor, 3rd Earl of Plymouth||1727||1732||
|-
|rowspan="2"|Earl of Holderness (1682)||Robert Darcy, 3rd Earl of Holderness||1692||1721||Died
|-
|Robert Darcy, 4th Earl of Holderness||1722||1778||
|-
|Earl of Stafford (1688)||William Stafford-Howard, 2nd Earl of Stafford||1719||1734||
|-
|Earl of Warrington (1690)||George Booth, 2nd Earl of Warrington||1694||1758||
|-
|rowspan="2"|Earl of Scarbrough (1690)||Richard Lumley, 1st Earl of Scarbrough||1690||1721||Died
|-
|Richard Lumley, 2nd Earl of Scarbrough||1721||1739||
|-
|rowspan="2"|Earl of Bradford (1694)||Richard Newport, 2nd Earl of Bradford||1708||1723||Died
|-
|Henry Newport, 3rd Earl of Bradford||1723||1734||
|-
|Earl of Rochford (1695)||Frederick Nassau de Zuylestein, 3rd Earl of Rochford||1710||1738||
|-
|Earl of Albemarle (1697)||Willem van Keppel, 2nd Earl of Albemarle||1718||1754||
|-
|Earl of Coventry (1697)||William Coventry, 5th Earl of Coventry||1719||1751||
|-
|Earl of Orford (1697)||Edward Russell, 1st Earl of Orford||1697||1727||Died, title extinct
|-
|rowspan="2"|Earl of Jersey (1697)||William Villiers, 2nd Earl of Jersey||1711||1721||Died
|-
|William Villiers, 3rd Earl of Jersey||1721||1769||
|-
|Earl of Grantham (1698)||Henry de Nassau d'Auverquerque, 1st Earl of Grantham||1698||1754||
|-
|Earl Poulett (1706)||John Poulett, 1st Earl Poulett||1706||1743||
|-
|Earl of Godolphin (1706)||Francis Godolphin, 2nd Earl of Godolphin||1712||1766||
|-
|rowspan="2"|Earl of Cholmondeley (1706)||Hugh Cholmondeley, 1st Earl of Cholmondeley||1706||1725||
|-
|George Cholmondeley, 2nd Earl of Cholmondeley||1725||1733||
|-
|colspan=5 style="background: #fcc" align="center"|Peerage of Scotland
|-
|Earl of Crawford (1398)||John Lindsay, 20th Earl of Crawford||1713||1749||
|-
|Earl of Erroll (1452)||Mary Hay, 14th Countess of Erroll||1717||1758||
|-
|Earl of Sutherland (1235)||John Gordon, 16th Earl of Sutherland||1703||1733||
|-
|rowspan=2|Earl of Rothes (1458)||John Hamilton-Leslie, 9th Earl of Rothes||1700||1722||Died
|-
|John Leslie, 10th Earl of Rothes||1722||1767||
|-
|Earl of Morton (1458)||Robert Douglas, 12th Earl of Morton||1715||1730||
|-
|Earl of Glencairn (1488)||William Cunningham, 12th Earl of Glencairn||1703||1734||
|-
|rowspan=2|Earl of Eglinton (1507)||Alexander Montgomerie, 9th Earl of Eglinton||1701||1729||Died
|-
|Alexander Montgomerie, 10th Earl of Eglinton||1729||1769||
|-
|Earl of Cassilis (1509)||John Kennedy, 8th Earl of Cassilis||1701||1759||
|-
|Earl of Caithness (1455)||Alexander Sinclair, 9th Earl of Caithness||1705||1765||
|-
|Earl of Buchan (1469)||David Erskine, 9th Earl of Buchan||1695||1745||
|-
|Earl of Moray (1562)||Charles Stuart, 6th Earl of Moray||1701||1735||
|-
|rowspan=2|Earl of Home (1605)||Alexander Home, 7th Earl of Home||1706||1720||Died
|-
|William Home, 8th Earl of Home||1720||1761||
|-
|Earl of Wigtown (1606)||John Fleming, 6th Earl of Wigtown||1681||1744||
|-
|Earl of Abercorn (1606)||James Hamilton, 6th Earl of Abercorn||1701||1734||
|-
|rowspan=2|Earl of Strathmore and Kinghorne (1606)||Charles Lyon, 6th Earl of Strathmore and Kinghorne||1715||1728||Died
|-
|James Lyon, 7th Earl of Strathmore and Kinghorne||1728||1735||
|-
|Earl of Kellie (1619)||Alexander Erskine, 5th Earl of Kellie||1710||1758||
|-
|Earl of Haddington (1619)||Thomas Hamilton, 6th Earl of Haddington||1685||1735||
|-
|Earl of Galloway (1623)||James Stewart, 5th Earl of Galloway||1694||1746||
|-
|Earl of Lauderdale (1624)||Charles Maitland, 6th Earl of Lauderdale||1710||1744||
|-
|Earl of Loudoun (1633)||Hugh Campbell, 3rd Earl of Loudoun||1684||1731||
|-
|Earl of Kinnoull (1633)||George Hay, 8th Earl of Kinnoull||1709||1758||
|-
|Earl of Dumfries (1633)||Penelope Crichton, 4th Countess of Dumfries||1694||1742||
|-
|Earl of Stirling (1633)||Henry Alexander, 5th Earl of Stirling||1691||1739||
|-
|Earl of Traquair (1633)||Charles Stewart, 4th Earl of Traquair||1673||1741||
|-
|rowspan=2|Earl of Wemyss (1633)||David Wemyss, 4th Earl of Wemyss||1705||1720||Died
|-
|James Wemyss, 5th Earl of Wemyss||1720||1756||
|-
|Earl of Dalhousie (1633)||William Ramsay, 6th Earl of Dalhousie||1710||1739||
|-
|Earl of Findlater (1638)||James Ogilvy, 4th Earl of Findlater||1711||1730||
|-
|rowspan=2|Earl of Leven (1641)||David Leslie, 3rd Earl of Leven||1676||1728||Died
|-
|Alexander Leslie, 5th Earl of Leven||1728||1754||
|-
|rowspan=2|Earl of Dysart (1643)||Lionel Tollemache, 3rd Earl of Dysart||1698||1727||Died
|-
|Lionel Tollemache, 4th Earl of Dysart||1727||1770||
|-
|Earl of Selkirk (1646)||Charles Douglas, 2nd Earl of Selkirk||1694||1739||
|-
|rowspan=2|Earl of Northesk (1647)||David Carnegie, 4th Earl of Northesk||1688||1729||Died
|-
|David Carnegie, 5th Earl of Northesk||1729||1741||
|-
|rowspan=2|Earl of Kincardine (1647)||Alexander Bruce, 6th Earl of Kincardine||1718||1721||Died
|-
|Thomas Bruce, 7th Earl of Kincardine||1721||1740||
|-
|rowspan=2|Earl of Balcarres (1651)||Colin Lindsay, 3rd Earl of Balcarres||1662||1722||Died
|-
|Alexander Lindsay, 4th Earl of Balcarres||1722||1736||
|-
|Earl of Aboyne (1660)||John Gordon, 3rd Earl of Aboyne||1702||1732||
|-
|Earl of Newburgh (1660)||Charles Livingston, 2nd Earl of Newburgh||1670||1755||
|-
|Earl of Kilmarnock (1661)||William Boyd, 4th Earl of Kilmarnock||1717||1746||
|-
|rowspan=3|Earl of Dundonald (1669)||John Cochrane, 4th Earl of Dundonald||1705||1720||Died
|-
|William Cochrane, 5th Earl of Dundonald||1720||1725||Died
|-
|Thomas Cochrane, 6th Earl of Dundonald||1725||1737||
|-
|Earl of Dumbarton (1675)||George Douglas, 2nd Earl of Dumbarton||1692||1749||
|-
|Earl of Kintore (1677)||John Keith, 3rd Earl of Kintore||1718||1758||
|-
|Earl of Breadalbane and Holland (1677)||John Campbell, 2nd Earl of Breadalbane and Holland||1717||1752||
|-
|rowspan=2|Earl of Aberdeen (1682)||George Gordon, 1st Earl of Aberdeen||1682||1720||Died
|-
|William Gordon, 2nd Earl of Aberdeen||1720||1746||
|-
|Earl of Dunmore (1686)||John Murray, 2nd Earl of Dunmore||1710||1752||
|-
|Earl of Orkney (1696)||George Hamilton, 1st Earl of Orkney||1696||1737||
|-
|Earl of Ruglen (1697)||John Hamilton, 1st Earl of Ruglen||1697||1744||
|-
|Earl of March (1697)||William Douglas, 2nd Earl of March||1705||1731||
|-
|rowspan=2|Earl of Marchmont (1697)||Patrick Hume, 1st Earl of Marchmont||1697||1724||Died
|-
|Alexander Hume-Campbell, 2nd Earl of Marchmont||1724||1740||
|-
|Earl of Hyndford (1701)||James Carmichael, 2nd Earl of Hyndford||1710||1737||
|-
|Earl of Cromartie (1703)||John Mackenzie, 2nd Earl of Cromartie||1714||1731||
|-
|Earl of Stair (1703)||John Dalrymple, 2nd Earl of Stair||1707||1747||
|-
|rowspan=2|Earl of Rosebery (1703)||Archibald Primrose, 1st Earl of Rosebery||1703||1723||Died
|-
|James Primrose, 2nd Earl of Rosebery||1723||1765||
|-
|Earl of Glasgow (1703)||David Boyle, 1st Earl of Glasgow||1703||1733||
|-
|Earl of Portmore (1703)||David Colyear, 1st Earl of Portmore||1703||1730||
|-
|rowspan=2|Earl of Bute (1703)||James Stuart, 2nd Earl of Bute||1710||1723||Died
|-
|John Stuart, 3rd Earl of Bute||1723||1792||
|-
|Earl of Hopetoun (1703)||Charles Hope, 1st Earl of Hopetoun||1703||1742||
|-
|Earl of Deloraine (1706)||Henry Scott, 1st Earl of Deloraine||1706||1730||
|-
|Earl of Ilay (1706)||Archibald Campbell, 1st Earl of Ilay||1706||1761||
|-
|colspan=5 style="background: #fcc" align="center"|Peerage of Great Britain
|-
|rowspan=2|Earl of Oxford and Mortimer (1711)||Robert Harley, 1st Earl of Oxford and Earl Mortimer||1711||1724||Died
|-
|Edward Harley, 2nd Earl of Oxford and Earl Mortimer||1724||1741||
|-
|Earl of Strafford (1711)||Thomas Wentworth, 1st Earl of Strafford||1711||1739||
|-
|rowspan=2|Earl Ferrers (1711)||Washington Shirley, 2nd Earl Ferrers||1711||1729||Died
|-
|Henry Shirley, 3rd Earl Ferrers||1729||1745||
|-
|Earl of Dartmouth (1711)||William Legge, 1st Earl of Dartmouth||1711||1750||
|-
|rowspan=2|Earl of Tankerville (1714)||Charles Bennet, 1st Earl of Tankerville||1714||1722||Died
|-
|Charles Bennet, 2nd Earl of Tankerville||1722||1753||
|-
|Earl of Aylesford (1714)||Heneage Finch, 2nd Earl of Aylesford||1740||1757||
|-
|Earl of Bristol (1714)||John Hervey, 1st Earl of Bristol||1714||1751||
|-
|rowspan=2|Earl of Rockingham (1714)||Lewis Watson, 1st Earl of Rockingham||1740||1724||Died
|-
|Lewis Watson, 2nd Earl of Rockingham||1724||1745||
|-
|Earl of Uxbridge (1714)||Henry Paget, 1st Earl of Uxbridge||1714||1743||
|-
|Earl Granville (1715)||Grace Carteret, 1st Countess Granville||1715||1744||
|-
|Earl of Halifax (1715)||George Montagu, 1st Earl of Halifax||1715||1739||
|-
|Earl of Sussex (1717)||Talbot Yelverton, 1st Earl of Sussex||1717||1731||
|-
|rowspan=2|Earl Cowper (1718)||William Cowper, 1st Earl Cowper||1718||1723||Died
|-
|William Clavering-Cowper, 2nd Earl Cowper||1723||1764||
|-
|rowspan=2|Earl Stanhope (1718)||James Stanhope, 1st Earl Stanhope||1740||1721||Died
|-
|Philip Stanhope, 2nd Earl Stanhope||1721||1786||
|-
|Earl Cadogan (1718)||William Cadogan, 1st Earl Cadogan||1718||1726||Died, peerage extinct
|-
|rowspan=2|Earl Coningsby (1719)||Thomas Coningsby, 1st Earl Coningsby||1719||1729||Died
|-
|Margaret Newton, 2nd Countess Coningsby||1729||1761||
|-
|Earl of Harborough (1719)||Bennet Sherard, 1st Earl of Harborough||1719||1732||
|-
|Earl Castleton (1720)||James Saunderson, 1st Earl Castleton||1720||1723||New creation; died, title extinct
|-
|Earl of Macclesfield (1721)||Thomas Parker, 1st Earl of Macclesfield||1721||1732||New creation
|-
|Earl of Pomfret (1721)||Thomas Fermor, 1st Earl of Pomfret||1721||1753||New creation
|-
|Countess of Darlington (1721)||Sophia von Kielmansegg, Countess of Darlington||1721||1725||New creation; died, title extinct
|-
|Countess of Walsingham (1722)||Melusina von der Schulenburg, Countess of Walsingham||1722||1778||New creation
|-
|Earl Graham of Belford (1722)||William Graham, 1st Earl Graham||1722||1790||New creation
|-
|Earl Ker (1722)||Robert Ker, 1st Earl Ker||1722||1790||New creation
|-
|Earl Waldegrave (1729)||James Waldegrave, 1st Earl Waldegrave||1729||1741||New creation
|-
|}

Viscounts

|colspan=5 style="background: #fcc" align="center"|Peerage of England
|-
|Viscount Hereford (1550)||Price Devereux, 9th Viscount Hereford||1700||1740||
|-
|Viscount Montagu (1554)||Anthony Browne, 6th Viscount Montagu||1717||1767||
|-
|Viscount Saye and Sele (1624)||Laurence Fiennes, 5th Viscount Saye and Sele||1710||1742||
|-
|Viscount Fauconberg (1643)||Thomas Belasyse, 4th Viscount Fauconberg||1718||1774||
|-
|Viscount Hatton (1682)||William Seton Hatton, 2nd Viscount Hatton||1706||1760||
|-
|Viscount Townshend (1682)||Charles Townshend, 2nd Viscount Townshend||1687||1738||
|-
|Viscount Weymouth (1682)||Thomas Thynne, 2nd Viscount Weymouth||1714||1751||
|-
|Viscount Lonsdale (1690)||Henry Lowther, 3rd Viscount Lonsdale||1713||1751||
|-
|colspan=5 style="background: #fcc" align="center"|Peerage of Scotland
|-
|Viscount of Falkland (1620)||Lucius Cary, 6th Viscount of Falkland||1694||1730||
|-
|Viscount of Stormont (1621)||David Murray, 5th Viscount of Stormont||1668||1731||
|-
|Viscount of Arbuthnott (1641)||John Arbuthnot, 5th Viscount of Arbuthnott||1710||1756||
|-
|rowspan=2|Viscount of Irvine (1661)||Rich Ingram, 5th Viscount of Irvine||1714||1721||Died
|-
|Arthur Ingram, 6th Viscount of Irvine||1721||1736||
|-
|Viscount Preston (1681)||Charles Graham, 3rd Viscount Preston||1710||1739||
|-
|Viscount of Newhaven (1681)||William Cheyne, 2nd Viscount Newhaven||1698||1728||Died; Peerage extinct
|-
|Viscount of Strathallan (1686)||William Drummond, 4th Viscount Strathallan||1711||1746||
|-
|Viscount of Garnock (1703)||Patrick Lindsay-Crawford, 2nd Viscount of Garnock||1708||1735||
|-
|Viscount of Primrose (1703)||Hugh Primrose, 3rd Viscount of Primrose||1716||1741||
|-
|colspan=5 style="background: #fcc" align="center"|Peerage of Great Britain
|-
|Viscount Bolingbroke (1712)||Henry St John, 1st Viscount Bolingbroke||1712||1751||
|-
|Viscount Tadcaster (1714)||Henry O'Brien, 1st Viscount Tadcaster||1714||1741||
|-
|Viscount St John (1716)||Henry St John, 1st Viscount St John||1716||1742||
|-
|Viscount Coningsby (1716)||Margaret Newton, 1st Viscountess Coningsby||1717||1761||Succeeded to the Earldom of Coningsby, see above
|-
|Viscount Cobham (1718)||Richard Temple, 1st Viscount Cobham||1718||1749||
|-
|Viscount Falmouth (1720)||Hugh Boscawen, 1st Viscount Falmouth||1720||1734||New creation
|-
|Viscount Lymington (1720)||John Wallop, 1st Viscount Lymington||1720||1762||New creation
|-
|Viscount Torrington (1721)||George Byng, 1st Viscount Torrington||1721||1733||New creation
|-
|rowspan=2|Viscount Harcourt (1721)||Simon Harcourt, 1st Viscount Harcourt||1721||1727||New creation; died
|-
|Simon Harcourt, 2nd Viscount Harcourt||1727||1777||
|-
|}

Barons

|colspan=5 style="background: #fcc" align="center"|Peerage of England
|-
|rowspan="2"|Baron FitzWalter (1295)||Charles Mildmay, 18th Baron FitzWalter||1679||1728||Died
|- 
|Benjamin Mildmay, 19th Baron FitzWalter||1728||1756||
|- 
|Baron Clinton (1299)||Hugh Fortescue, 14th Baron Clinton||1721||1751||Abeyance terminated
|- 
|Baron Ferrers of Chartley (1299)||Elizabeth Compton, 15th Baroness Ferrers of Chartley||1717||1741||
|- 
|Baron Dudley (1440)||Edward Ward, 9th Baron Dudley||1704||1731||
|- 
|rowspan="2"|Baron Stourton (1448)||Edward Stourton, 13th Baron Stourton||1685||1720||Died
|- 
|Thomas Stourton, 14th Baron Stourton||1720||1744||
|- 
|Baron Berners (1455)||Katherine Bokenham, 8th Baroness Berners||1711||1743||Abeyance terminated
|- 
|rowspan="2"|Baron Willoughby de Broke (1491)||George Verney, 12th Baron Willoughby de Broke||1711||1728||Died
|- 
|Richard Verney, 13th Baron Willoughby de Broke||1728||1752||
|- 
|Baron Wentworth (1529)||Martha Johnson, 8th Baroness Wentworth||1697||1745||
|-
|Baron Willoughby of Parham (1547)||Hugh Willoughby, 15th Baron Willoughby of Parham||1715||1765||
|-
|Baron North (1554)||William North, 6th Baron North||1691||1734||
|-
|rowspan="2"|Baron Howard of Effingham (1554)||Thomas Howard, 6th Baron Howard of Effingham||1695||1725||Died
|-
|Francis Howard, 7th Baron Howard of Effingham||1725||1743||
|-
|Baron Hunsdon (1559)||William Ferdinand Carey, 8th Baron Hunsdon||1702||1765||
|-
|rowspan="3"|Baron St John of Bletso (1559)||William St John, 9th Baron St John of Bletso||1714||1720||Died
|-
|Rowland St John, 10th Baron St John of Bletso||1720||1722||Died
|-
|John St John, 11th Baron St John of Bletso||1722||1757||
|-
|rowspan="2"|Baron De La Warr (1570)||John West, 6th Baron De La Warr||1687||1723||Died
|-
|John West, 7th Baron De La Warr||1723||1766||
|-
|Baron Gerard (1603)||Philip Gerard, 7th Baron Gerard||1707||1733||
|-
|Baron Petre (1603)||Robert Petre, 8th Baron Petre||1713||1742||
|-
|rowspan="2"|Baron Arundell of Wardour (1605)||Henry Arundell, 5th Baron Arundell of Wardour||1712||1726||Died
|-
|Henry Arundell, 6th Baron Arundell of Wardour||1726||1746||
|-
|rowspan="2"|Baron Clifton (1608)||Theodosia Bligh, 10th Baroness Clifton||1713||1722||Died
|-
|Edward Bligh, 11th Baron Clifton||1722||1747||Succeeded to the Earldom of Darnley, see above
|-
|rowspan="2"|Baron Dormer (1615)||Charles Dormer, 5th Baron Dormer||1712||1728||Died
|-
|Charles Dormer, 6th Baron Dormer||1728||1761||
|-
|rowspan="3"|Baron Teynham (1616)||Henry Roper, 8th Baron Teynham||1699||1723||Died
|-
|Philip Roper, 9th Baron Teynham||1723||1727||Died
|-
|Henry Roper, 10th Baron Teynham||1727||1781||
|-
|rowspan="2"|Baron Brooke (1621)||William Greville, 7th Baron Brooke||1711||1727||Died
|-
|Francis Greville, 8th Baron Brooke||1727||1773||
|-
|Baron Craven (1627)||William Craven, 3rd Baron Craven||1711||1739||
|-
|Baron Lovelace (1627)||Nevill Lovelace, 6th Baron Lovelace ||1709||1736||
|-
|Baron Strange (1628)||Henrietta Ashburnham, 5th Baroness Strange||1718||1732||
|-
|Baron Maynard (1628)||Henry Maynard, 4th Baron Maynard||1718||1742||
|-
|Baron Leigh (1643)||Edward Leigh, 3rd Baron Leigh||1710||1738||
|-
|Baron Byron (1643)||William Byron, 4th Baron Byron||1695||1736||
|-
|Baron Colepeper (1644)||Cheney Colepeper, 4th Baron Colepeper||1719||1725||Died, title extinct
|-
|Baron Lexinton (1645)||Robert Sutton, 2nd Baron Lexinton||1668||1723||Died, title extinct
|-
|Baron Langdale (1658)||Marmaduke Langdale, 4th Baron Langdale||1718||1771||
|-
|Baron Berkeley of Stratton (1658)||William Berkeley, 4th Baron Berkeley of Stratton||1697||1741||
|-
|rowspan="2"|Baron Cornwallis (1661)||Charles Cornwallis, 4th Baron Cornwallis||1698||1722||Died
|-
|Charles Cornwallis, 5th Baron Cornwallis||1722||1762||
|-
|Baron Crew (1661)||Nathaniel Crew, 3rd Baron Crew||1697||1721||Died, title extinct
|-
|Baron Arundell of Trerice (1664)||John Arundell, 4th Baron Arundell of Trerice||1706||1768||
|-
|Baron Clifford of Chudleigh (1672)||Hugh Clifford, 2nd Baron Clifford of Chudleigh||1673||1730||
|-
|Baron Willoughby of Parham (1680)||Hugh Willoughby, 15th Baron Willoughby of Parham||1715||1765||
|-
|Baron Carteret (1681)||John Carteret, 2nd Baron Carteret||1695||1763||
|-
|Baron Stawell (1683)||William Stawell, 3rd Baron Stawell||1692||1742||
|-
|rowspan="2"|Baron Guilford (1683)||Francis North, 2nd Baron Guilford||1685||1729||Died
|-
|Francis North, 3rd Baron Guilford||1729||1790||
|-
|Baron Waldegrave (1686)||James Waldegrave, 2nd Baron Waldegrave||1689||1741||Created Earl Waldegrave, see above
|-
|Baron Griffin (1688)||Edward Griffin, 3rd Baron Griffin||1715||1742||
|-
|Baron Ashburnham (1689)||John Ashburnham, 3rd Baron Ashburnham||1710||1730||
|-
|Baron Leominster (1692)||Thomas Fermor, 2nd Baron Leominster||1711||1753||Created Earl of Pomfret, see above
|-
|Baron Herbert of Chirbury (1694)||Henry Herbert, 2nd Baron Herbert of Chirbury||1709||1738||
|-
|rowspan="3"|Baron Bergavenny (1695)||George Nevill, 13th Baron Bergavenny||1695||1721||Died
|-
|George Nevill, 14th Baron Bergavenny||1721||1723||Died
|-
|Edward Nevill, 15th Baron Bergavenny||1723||1724||Died, Barony fell into abeyance
|-
|Baron Haversham (1696)||Maurice Thompson, 2nd Baron Haversham||1710||1745||
|-
|rowspan="2"|Baron Barnard (1698)||Christopher Vane, 1st Baron Barnard||1698||1723||Died
|-
|Gilbert Vane, 2nd Baron Barnard||1723||1753||
|-
|Baron Gower (1703)||John Leveson-Gower, 2nd Baron Gower||1709||1754||
|-
|Baron Conway (1703)||Francis Seymour-Conway, 1st Baron Conway||1703||1732||
|-
|colspan=5 style="background: #fcc" align="center"|Peerage of Scotland
|-
|Lord Somerville (1430)||James Somerville, 13th Lord Somerville||1709||1765||
|-
|Lord Forbes (1442)||William Forbes, 13th Lord Forbes||1716||1730||
|-
|Lord Saltoun (1445)||Alexander Fraser, 13th Lord Saltoun||1715||1748||
|-
|rowspan=2|Lord Gray (1445)||John Gray, 9th Lord Gray||1711||1724||Died
|-
|John Gray, 10th Lord Gray||1724||1738||
|-
|Lord Sinclair (1449)||Henry St Clair, 10th Lord Sinclair||1676||1723||Died; his heir was under attainder
|-
|rowspan=3|Lord Oliphant (1455)||Patrick Oliphant, 8th Lord Oliphant||1709||1721||Died
|-
|William Oliphant, 9th Lord Oliphant||1709||1721||Died
|-
|Francis Oliphant, 10th Lord Oliphant||1721||1748||
|-
|Lord Cathcart (1460)||Alan Cathcart, 7th Lord Cathcart||1709||1732||
|-
|Lord Lovat (1464)||Simon Fraser, 11th Lord Lovat||1699||1746||
|-
|rowspan=2|Lord Sempill (1489)||John Sempill, 11th Lord Sempill||1716||1727||Died
|-
|Hugh Sempill, 12th Lord Sempill||1727||1746||
|-
|Lord Ross (1499)||William Ross, 12th Lord Ross||1682||1738||
|-
|Lord Elphinstone (1509)||Charles Elphinstone, 9th Lord Elphinstone||1718||1757||
|-
|Lord Torphichen (1564)||James Sandilands, 7th Lord Torphichen||1696||1753||
|-
|Lord Lindores (1600)||Alexander Leslie, 6th Lord Lindores||1719||1765||
|-
|Lord Colville of Culross (1604)||John Colville, 6th Lord Colville of Culross||1717||1741||
|-
|Lord Balmerinoch (1606)||John Elphinstone, 4th Lord Balmerino||1704||1736||
|-
|Lord Blantyre (1606)||Robert Stuart, 7th Lord Blantyre||1713||1743||
|-
|rowspan=2|Lord Cranstoun (1609)||William Cranstoun, 5th Lord Cranstoun||1688||1727||Died
|-
|James Cranstoun, 6th Lord Cranstoun||1727||1773||
|-
|Lord Aston of Forfar (1627)||Walter Aston, 4th Lord Aston of Forfar||1714||1748||
|-
|Lord Fairfax of Cameron (1627)||Thomas Fairfax, 6th Lord Fairfax of Cameron||1710||1781||
|-
|Lord Napier (1627)||Francis Napier, 6th Lord Napier||1706||1773||
|-
|Lord Reay (1628)||George Mackay, 3rd Lord Reay||1681||1748||
|-
|Lord Cramond (1628)||William Richardson, 5th Lord Cramond||1719||1735||
|-
|Lord Forbes of Pitsligo (1633)||Alexander Forbes, 4th Lord Forbes of Pitsligo||1690||1746||
|-
|Lord Kirkcudbright (1633)||James Maclellan, 6th Lord Kirkcudbright||1678||1730||
|-
|Lord Fraser (1633)||Charles Fraser, 4th Lord Fraser||Abt 1680||1720||Died; Peerage dormant
|-
|rowspan=2|Lord Forrester (1633)||George Forrester, 5th Lord Forrester||1705||1727||Died
|-
|George Forrester, 6th Lord Forrester||1727||1748||
|-
|Lord Bargany (1641)||James Hamilton, 4th Lord Bargany||1712||1736||
|-
|Lord Banff (1642)||John George Ogilvy, 5th Lord Banff||1718||1738||
|-
|Lord Elibank (1643)||Alexander Murray, 4th Lord Elibank||1687||1736||
|-
|rowspan=2|Lord Falconer of Halkerton (1646)||David Falconer, 3rd Lord Falconer of Halkerton||1684||1724||Died
|-
|David Falconer, 4th Lord Falconer of Halkerton||1724||1751||
|-
|rowspan=2|Lord Belhaven and Stenton (1647)||John Hamilton, 3rd Lord Belhaven and Stenton||1708||1721||
|-
|John Hamilton, 4th Lord Belhaven and Stenton||1721||1764||
|-
|Lord Duffus (1650)||Kenneth Sutherland, 3rd Lord Duffus||1705||1734||
|-
|Lord Rollo (1651)||Robert Rollo, 4th Lord Rollo||1700||1758||
|-
|rowspan=2|Lord Ruthven of Freeland (1650)||Jean Ruthven, 3rd Lady Ruthven of Freeland||1701||1722||Died
|-
|Isobel Ruthven, 4th Lady Ruthven of Freeland||1722||1783||
|-
|Lord Rutherfurd (1661)||Robert Rutherfurd, 4th Lord Rutherfurd||1685||1724||Died; Peerage dormant
|-
|Lord Bellenden (1661)||John Bellenden, 3rd Lord Bellenden||1707||1741||
|-
|rowspan=2|Lord Kinnaird (1682)||Patrick Kinnaird, 4th Lord Kinnaird||1715||1727||Died
|-
|Charles Kinnaird, 5th Lord Kinnaird||1727||1758||
|-
|}

References

 

1720
1720s in England
1720s in Ireland
1720s in Scotland
Peers
Peers
Peers
Peers
Peers
Peers
18th-century nobility